Hiria Kokoro-Barrett (3 June 1870–1943) was a New Zealand tribal leader, craftswoman, and mutton-birder. Of Māori descent, she identified with the Ngāi Tahu and Ngati Mamoe iwi. She was born in Tuahiwi, North Canterbury, New Zealand on 3 June 1870.

References

1870 births
1943 deaths
People from Tuahiwi
Ngāi Tahu people
Kāti Māmoe people
New Zealand Māori artists